Mount Pulai is a mountain located in the district of Kulai, Johor, Malaysia.

History

World War II

During the World War II, Mount Pulai served as the British Commonwealth armies stronghold against the invading Japanese Imperial Army. There are still remnant of fortress, rails, tunnels, aircraft landing site and wells deep at the mount forest. There are initiative by non governmental organization (NGO) to reintroduce Mount Pulai as a jungle war memorial to educate the peoples on the story of the mount during the World War II.

Closure of Gunung Pulai

Gunung Pulai is the source of Pulai River which flows through the districts of Kulai, Mukim Pulai (Johor Bahru) and Pontian. Excessive mining activities at the foot of Mount Pulai by Chinese mineral mining company has destroyed the natural landscape of the area. Local villagers in the vicinity of the mountain reported up to 75 floods between 1986 and 2021. The most notable mud flood occurred on 26th December 2001 which resulted in 5 deaths and the destruction of 4 houses. Consequently, the mount had been closed for visitors between 2001 and 2015, when Mount Pulai Recreational Forest 1 reopened.

Geology
The mountain features the Pulai Waterfall and Mount Pulai Recreational Forest 1 and 2.

Infrastructure
The mountain houses three telecommunication towers. Two are located at the peak of the mountain and another one is located slightly lower from the peak.

See also
 Geography of Malaysia

References

Kulai District
Pulai